"Burnin' for You" is a song by American hard rock band Blue Öyster Cult. It was released as the lead single from the band's eighth studio album, Fire of Unknown Origin, released in June 1981, where it was the album's second track. The song was co-written by guitarist Donald "Buck Dharma" Roeser and rock critic songwriter Richard Meltzer, who wrote lyrics for several of the band's songs. Roeser sang lead vocals on the song (as he also did on the band's biggest chart hit, 1976's "(Don't Fear) The Reaper") in lieu of Blue Öyster Cult's usual lead vocalist Eric Bloom.

The song hit No. 1 on the Billboard Mainstream Rock chart, and the single spent three weeks in the Top 40 (peaking at No. 40) on the Billboard Hot 100 chart. It was aided by a popular early MTV music video.

Composition 
"Burnin' for You" was written by Blue Öyster Cult lead guitarist Buck Dharma and rock critic Richard Meltzer. Meltzer wrote numerous songs for the band, with many in conjunction with Roeser. Dharma wrote his parts of the song in his garage studio.

Dharma originally planned to keep the song for release on his 1982 solo debut album Flat Out. However, Blue Öyster Cult's manager Sandy Pearlman convinced him to give the song to the band.

Reception 
The song reached No. 40 on the Billboard Hot 100, becoming the band's second and final top 40 hit after "(Don't Fear) The Reaper" reached No. 12 on the Hot 100 in 1976. It was Blue Öyster Cult's third song to ever chart on the Hot 100 and it would be their second to last after "Shooting Shark" peaked at No. 83 in 1984.

"Burnin' for You" also became Blue Öyster Cult's first song to chart on Billboard's newly-created Top Tracks chart (now known as Mainstream Rock Songs). It reached No. 1 on the chart dated the week of August 22, 1981, in its eighth week on the chart. It was the seventh song to ever reach No. 1 on the chart, and it stayed at No. 1 for two weeks. "Burnin' for You" remains Blue Öyster Cult's only number-one hit on the rock charts, and one of two top ten hits ("Dancin' in the Ruins" reached No. 9 in 1986). The song stayed on the chart for 23 weeks.

Record World said that it's "one of [Blue Oyster Cult's] most commercial outings to date, thanks to Eric Bloom's passionate vocals and a nifty melody."

Personnel 

 Eric Bloom – backing vocals
 Donald 'Buck Dharma' Roeser – lead guitar, lead vocals
 Allen Lanier – keyboards
 Joe Bouchard – bass guitar, backing vocals
 Albert Bouchard – drums, backing vocals

Chart performance

See also
List of Billboard Mainstream Rock number-one songs of the 1980s

References

1981 songs
1981 singles
Blue Öyster Cult songs
Songs written by Buck Dharma
Songs written by Richard Meltzer
Columbia Records singles